Charley Mitchell may refer to:

 Charley Mitchell (boxer) (1861–1918), world heavyweight boxing title contender
 Charley Mitchell (American football) (born 1940), professional American football player

See also 
 Charlie Mitchell (disambiguation)